Bell County is the name of two counties in the United States:
Bell County, Kentucky 
Bell County, Texas